Horlaville is a surname. Notable people with the surname include:

Christophe Horlaville (born 1969), French footballer
Daniel Horlaville (born 1945), French footballer